Lampropeltis getula brooksi (also known as Brooks' kingsnake) is a subspecies of nonvenomous snake in the family Colubridae. Lampropeltis getula brooksi is one of several subspecies of Lampropeltis getula.

Etymology
The subspecific name, brooksi, is in honor of American zoologist Winthrop Sprague Brooks (1887–1965).

Geographic range
L. g. brooksi is found in southern Florida.

References

getula brooksi
Fauna of the Southeastern United States
Reptiles of the United States